The Journal of Arthur Stirling is a novel by author Upton Sinclair, published in 1903. It is written in a first-person perspective, with the main fictional character being Arthur Stirling. Stirling, unknown poet and writer sets out to write his first poem, The Captive. He begins writing a journal to help him further his work as an artist—the novel being the journal. The novel begins with an introduction by a character who calls himself, "S."; Stirling already dead by suicide, sends S. a copy of the journal, as well as The Captive for him to read. S. explains the production of the novel in a sense of tribute to Stirling.

Sinclair planted an obituary for Stirling in The New York Times "to raise a sensation", but was widely criticized by journalists and editors for the hoax.

Upton Sinclair's original version is currently in the Public Domain.

Reception

References

External links
"Who Was Arthur Stirling" a 1903 NY times article
 Read, The Journal of Arthur Stirling in its entirety at ManyBooks.net

1903 American novels
Novels by Upton Sinclair
Heinemann (publisher) books
D. Appleton & Company books